José María Castellano Ríos is a Spanish businessman, born in A Coruña, Galicia, Spain in 1947.

Castellano is the former CEO and Deputy Chairman of the Inditex Group, which is one of the largest fashion groups in the world and includes brand stores such as Zara, Massimo Dutti, and Bershka. He also takes part into the strategy of N.M. Rothschild as a senior advisor.

References

Spanish businesspeople
Businesspeople from Galicia (Spain)
Living people
1947 births
People from A Coruña
N M Rothschild & Sons people